Třebešice is name of several locations in the Czech Republic:
Třebešice (Benešov District)
Třebešice (Kutná Hora District)